Kristi Albers (born December 7, 1963) is an American professional golfer who played on the LPGA Tour. She also played under her maiden name Kristi Arrington before her marriage in 1987.

Albers won once on the LPGA Tour in 1993.

Professional wins (1)

LPGA Tour wins (1)

References

External links

American female golfers
LPGA Tour golfers
Golfers from Texas
New Mexico Lobos athletes
Sportspeople from El Paso, Texas
1963 births
Living people
21st-century American women